The Diocese of Pueblo is a Latin Church ecclesiastical territory, or diocese, of the Catholic Church in southern Colorado in the United States.  The diocese was created on November 15, 1941. It encompasses the southern half of Colorado, from the state's borders with Utah to the west, to Kansas in the east. The Cathedral of the Sacred Heart in Pueblo is the seat of the diocese. The Diocese of Pueblo is a suffragan diocese part of the ecclesiastical province of the metropolitan Archdiocese of Denver.

In 2009, the diocese had nearly 100,000 registered Catholics, about 16% of the population.

History

1800 to 1940 
Until the Mexican-American War (1846 to 1849), the Pueblo area was controlled by Mexico, with all Catholic missions under the jurisdiction of the Archdiocese of Durango. After the war, the United States assumed control of the region. In 1851, Pope Pius IX created the Apostolic Vicariate of New Mexico, including Colorado.  The Vatican converted the vicariate into the Diocese of Santa Fe in 1853.

The first church in the Pueblo area was the Our Lady of Guadalupe Catholic Church, constructed in 1858 in Conejos by colonists from New Mexico. In 1868, Pope Pius IX removed territory from the Diocese of Santa Fe and the Diocese of Grass Valley to form the Vicariate Apostolic of Colorado and Utah. In 1870, the pope erected the Vicariate Apostolic of Colorado, covering only the state of Colorado. On August 16, 1887, Pope Leo XIII converted the vicariate into the Diocese of Denver.

1940 to present 
On November 15, 1941, Pope Pius XII separated territory from the Archdiocese of Denver to form the Diocese of Pueblo. He appointed Joseph Willging from the Diocese of Helena as the first bishop of Pueblo. During his 17-year-long tenure, Willging increased the number of parishes from 39 to 60, and the number of priests from 84 to 151. He also encouraged the establishment of parochial schools and Catholic hospitals. The last official Roman Catholic "cruzado" or Crusade tax, referring to the tax taken to fund the Crusades, was not abolished by the Diocese of Pueblo, Colorado until 1945. died in 1959 after 17 years as bishop.

Pope John XXIII appointed Reverend Charles Buswell of the Diocese of Oklahoma City-Tulsa as the second bishop of Pueblo. Buswell resigned in 1979.  He was replaced by Reverend Arthur Tafoya of the Archdiocese of Santa Fe in 1980 by Pope John Paul II. On November 10, 1983, John Paul II removed several counties from the Diocese of Pueblo to form the Diocese of Colorado Springs.  After 29 years as bishop, Tafoya retired in 2009.  That same year,, Reverend Fernando Isern of the Archdiocese of Miami was appointed the fourth bishop of Pueblo by Pope Benedict XVI.

After Isern retired in 2013, Pope Francis named Reverend Stephen Berg of the Diocese of Fort Worth to replace him.  Berg is the current bishop of the Diocese of Pueblo.

===Reports of sex abuse===
In 1990, Diocese of Pueblo priest William Groves was arrested and pleaded guilty to sex abuse. As part his plea bargain, more serious sex abuse charges against Groves were dropped and he received a sentence of only four years probation and sex abuse treatment 

On October 23, 2019, an investigation by Colorado Attorney General Phil Weiser revealed that 43 Catholic clergy were credibly accused of sexually abusing at least 166 children throughout Colorado since 1950. At least 36 of these children were molested by 19 clergy serving in the Diocese of Pueblo. 

On October 16, 2020, it was revealed that all three of Colorado's Catholic Dioceses, including the Diocese of Pueblo, had paid a total of $6.6 million in compensation to 81 victims of clergy sex abuse within the past year. On December 1, 2020, Weiser's final report revealed that there were an additional nine credibly accused clergy and 46 alleged victims in both the Diocese of Pueblo and Archdiocese of Denver. Four of these priests (Monsignor Marvin Kapushion, Father Duane Repola, Father Carlos Trujillo, and Father Joseph Walsh) were accused of committing acts of sex abuse while serving in the Diocese of Pueblo.

Bishops

Bishops of Pueblo
Joseph Clement Willging (1941-1959)
Charles Albert Buswell (1959-1979)
Arthur Nicholas Tafoya (1980-2009)
Fernando Isern (2009-2013)
Stephen Jay Berg (2014–present)

Other diocesan priest who became a bishop
David Laurin Ricken, appointed Coadjutor Bishop and Bishop of Cheyenne and later Bishop of Green Bay

Schools
Holy Family Catholic School (Grand Junction)
St. Columba Catholic School (Durango)
St. Therese Catholic School (Pueblo)

There was previously Pueblo Catholic High School but it closed in 1971. By 1975 all Catholic schools in Pueblo had closed.

References

External links
Diocese of Pueblo Official Site

 
Roman Catholic Ecclesiastical Province of Denver
Catholic Church in Colorado
Christian organizations established in 1941
Pueblo, Colorado
Pueblo
Pueblo